Akademi Kernewek is the official academic body responsible for the linguistic development of the Cornish language. It is responsible for setting standards for the language, developing dictionaries in the Standard Written Form, advising on street and place names, developing terminology and carrying out research. The academy consists of a management board and four panels.

References

Cornish culture
Cornish language
Language regulators
Organisations based in Cornwall
Organizations established in 2015
2015 establishments in the United Kingdom